The 9 cm Feldkanone M 75/96 was a field gun used by Austria-Hungary during World War I, a modernized version of the M 75 field gun. Virtually all the M 76s were upgraded during 1898. For cost reasons the new gun retained the bronze barrel of the original, although it was actually redesigned to withstand the more powerful propellants coming into use. A touch hole lock was added to prevent accidental misfiring when the breech was open. A spring-mounted spade brake reduced recoil from 5–6 metres to 80 centimetres, although it only worked if the spade was buried in the ground. A depression lever was added to elevate the carriage's trail to allow the gun greater depression in mountainous areas. Many guns had shields added after the outbreak of World War I.

References 
 Ortner, M. Christian. The Austro-Hungarian Artillery From 1867 to 1918: Technology, Organization, and Tactics. Vienna, Verlag Militaria, 2007 
 Łukasz Chrzanowski. "Artyleria Austro-Węgierska 1860-1890" Przemyśl, Wydawnictwo FORT, 2008, 

World War I guns
World War I artillery of Austria-Hungary
87 mm artillery